Thorvald Larsen (born 19 May 1934) is a retired Norwegian footballer and bandy player.

He grew up in Sagene. He played football on the highest level in Norway; four seasons in Vålerengen. Here he won the Norwegian First Division 1965, and also played and scored in the 1966–67 European Cup. Larsen was also capped for the Norway national bandy team.

He married and had three children. In 1970, he moved to Asker, working as a machine engineer. He chaired the local sports club Asker SK for two years.

References

1934 births
Living people
Sportspeople from Oslo
Norwegian footballers
Vålerenga Fotball players
Norwegian bandy players
People from Asker

Association footballers not categorized by position
20th-century Norwegian people